Sublime redención (English title:Amazing redemption) is a Mexican telenovela by Televisa in 1971 for Telesistema Mexicano.

Cast 
José Baviera
Alicia Bonet
Gregorio Casal
Irma Dorantes
Ofelia Guilmáin
José Gálvez
Antonio de Hud
Delia Magaña
Carmen Salinas
Gonzalo Vega

References 

Mexican telenovelas
1971 telenovelas
Televisa telenovelas
Spanish-language telenovelas
1971 Mexican television series debuts
1971 Mexican television series endings